Kenneth Cordele Griffin (born October 15, 1968) is an American hedge fund manager, entrepreneur and investor. He is the founder, chief executive officer, co-chief investment officer, and 80% owner of Citadel LLC, a multinational hedge fund. He also owns Citadel Securities, one of the largest market makers in the U.S.

In 2022 Griffin had an estimated net worth of US$27.2 billion and was ranked 53rd on the Forbes 400 list of richest people in the United States. He was included in Forbes 2023 list of America's Most Generous Givers, stating that Griffin has donated $1.56 billion to various charitable causes, primarily consisting of education, economic mobility and medical research. 

Griffin has contributed tens of millions of dollars to political candidates and causes, primarily those of the Republican Party. He has also donated to a number of charitable causes, particularly in the fields of education and the arts. He owns an art collection valued at $800 million and personal residences valued in total at over $1 billion.

Early life and education
Griffin was born in 1968 in Daytona Beach, Florida, the son of a building supplies executive. Griffin's father had various jobs, and was a project manager for General Electric. Griffin's grandmother, Genevieve Huebsch Gratz, inherited an oil business, three farms, and a seed business.

Griffin grew up in Boca Raton, Florida, with some time in Texas, and Wisconsin. He went to middle school in Boca Raton followed by Boca Raton Community High School, where he was the president of the math club. In high school, Griffin ran a discount mail-order education software firm out of his bedroom called EDCOM. In a 1986 article in the Sun-Sentinel, Griffin stated that he thought he would become a businessman or lawyer and that he believed the job market for computer programmers would significantly decrease over the coming decade.

Griffin started at Harvard College in the fall of 1986. That year, one of his first investments was to buy put options on Home Shopping Network, making a $5,000 profit. He also invested in convertible arbitrage opportunities in convertible bonds. Despite a ban on running businesses from campus, Griffin convinced school administrators to allow him to install a satellite dish on the roof of the Cabot House dormitory to receive stock quotes. He also asked Terrence J. O’Connor, the manager of convertible bonds at Merrill Lynch in Boston, to open a brokerage account for him with $100,000 that Griffin had gotten from his grandmother, his dentist, and others. His first fund launched in 1987 with $265,000, days after his 19th birthday. The fund launched in time to profit from short positions on Black Monday (1987). Griffin graduated in 1989 with a degree in economics.

Career
After graduating in 1989, Griffin moved to Chicago to work with Frank Meyer, founder of Glenwood Capital Investments. Meyer allotted $1 million of Glenwood capital for Griffin to trade and Griffin made 70% in a year.

A year later, in 1990, Griffin founded Citadel LLC, with assets under management of $4.6 million, aided by contributions from Meyer. His funds made 43% in 1991 and 40% in 1992.

In the early 2000s, Griffin founded market maker Citadel Securities.

In 2003, aged 34, Griffin was the youngest individual on the Forbes 400 with an estimated net worth of $650 million.

From the time of his marriage in 2003 until late 2009, Griffin was the lead investor in Aragon Global Management, a hedge fund run by his then-wife Anne Dias-Griffin. The fund was also seeded with money from Julian Robertson. Ken lost 20% of his investment in the fund.

In 2006, Citadel acquired the positions of Amaranth Advisors at a steep discount.

During the financial crisis of 2007-2008, for 10 months, Griffin barred his investors from withdrawing money, attracting criticism. At the peak of the crisis, the firm was losing "hundreds of millions of dollars each week". It was leveraged 7:1 and the biggest funds at Citadel finished 2008 down 55%. However, they rebounded with a 62% return in 2009.

From Citadel LLC, Griffin earned $900 million in 2009, $1.4 billion in 2014 $600 million in 2016, $1.4 billion in 2017, $870 million in 2018, $1.5 billion in 2019, and $1.8 billion in 2020.

In 2015, at his own expense, Griffin hired Katy Perry and Maroon 5 to entertain his employees.

In November 2020, according to Bloomberg News, Griffin's net worth surpassed $20 billion due to an increase the value of Citadel, of which Griffin's stake was worth $11.2 billion. Citadel Securities, a market maker, increased its profit to $2.36 billion during the first half of 2020 compared to $982 million for the same period in 2019 due to increased volatility, volume and retail trader engagement.

In January 2021, Griffin attracted criticism for the role played by Citadel in the GameStop short squeeze. On January 25, it was announced that Griffin's Citadel would invest $2 billion into Melvin Capital, which had suffered losses of more than 30% on account of its short positions, particularly on GameStop. On January 28, Robinhood, an electronic trading platform favored by many traders involved in buying GameStop stock and options, abruptly announced that it would halt all purchases of GameStop securities except to cover shorts and would only allow these securities to be sold if already held (but not sold short); the price of GME stock declined steeply shortly thereafter. Because Robinhood receives a substantial portion of its revenue through a payment for order flow relationship with Citadel Securities LLC, 85% of which is owned by Griffin, many commentators criticized the potential for a conflict of interest when the same entity both plays the role of market-maker and also participates in the market that it makes; Griffin personally has been at the center of much discussion on this controversy. On February 18, 2021, Griffin testified before the House Financial Services Committee to address his role in the GameStop controversy; Griffin has donated money directly to four congresspeople on the committee, including Republicans French Hill, Andy Barr, Ann Wagner, and Bill Huizenga.

Philanthropy

Education
Griffin has worked with the Bill and Melinda Gates Foundation in the promotion of charter schools in the U.S. and to fund tutoring.

In 2011, he worked with University of Chicago economics professor John A. List to test whether investment in teachers or in parents produces better student performance outcomes.

At the beginning of 2014, Griffin made a $150 million donation to the financial aid program at Harvard University, his alma mater, the largest single donation ever made to the institution at the time.

In 2014, he was elected to a five-year term on the University of Chicago's board of trustees. He is also a member of the Economic Club of Chicago and the civic committee of the Commercial Club of Chicago. Griffin is the vice chairman of the Chicago Public Education Fund.

In October 2017, Griffin's charitable fund donated $1 million to the Obama Foundation.

In November 2017, Griffin's charitable fund made a $125 million gift to support the Department of Economics of the University of Chicago, renamed the Kenneth C. Griffin Department of Economics.

In April 2021, he donated $5 million to an initiative to provide Internet access to students in Miami.

Griffin donated $21.5 million to the Field Museum of Natural History and its dinosaur exhibit is named the Griffin Dinosaur Experience.

In October 2019, Griffin's charitable fund announced a $125 million gift to the Museum of Science and Industry in Chicago, the largest gift in the museum's history. The museum will be renamed the Kenneth C. Griffin Museum of Science and Industry.

In November 2021, Griffin outbid a group of crypto investors to purchase the last privately held copy of the United States Constitution at auction for $43.2 million. Griffin stated "I intend to ensure that this copy of our Constitution will be available for all Americans and visitors to view and appreciate in our museums and other public spaces", with plans to display it first at the Crystal Bridges Museum of American Art in Arkansas.

Poverty
Griffin supported the University of Chicago's Center for Urban School Improvement, a program encouraging the construction of an inner-city charter high school, and contributed to the Lurie Children's Hospital.

In 2017, Griffin contributed $15 million to the Robin Hood Foundation.

In May 2022, The University of Chicago announced a $25 million donation from Kenneth Grifin to launch an initiative design to train police managers and prevent neighbourhood violence. The funds will aid in launching two community Safety Leadership Academies. The Policing Management Academy aims to professionalise departments by educating their leaders though coaching, accountability and data-driven decision making. This donation came after Griffins $10 million donation to the Crime Lab in 2018 to implement an early intervention system to investigate citizens' complaints.

Arts
Griffin has been on the board of trustees of the Museum of Contemporary Art, Chicago since 2000 and regularly supports its exhibitions.

In July 2007, Griffin donated a $19 million addition to the Art Institute of Chicago that was designed by Renzo Piano and named Kenneth and Anne Griffin Court. The Paul Cézanne paintings have also been loaned to the institute.

In 2010, Griffin contributed to the Chicago Symphony Orchestra's productions at Millennium Park.

Griffin has contributed to the Art Institute of Chicago. He serves on the board of trustees at the Whitney Museum of American Art in New York, whose lobby bears his name: Kenneth C. Griffin Hall. In February 2015, Griffin donated $10 million to the Museum of Contemporary Art, Chicago and used to create the Griffin Galleries of Contemporary Art.

In December 2015, he donated an unrestricted $40 million to the Museum of Modern Art in New York.

In 2018, he donated $20 million to the Norton Museum of Art.

In 2021 he outbid a group of crypto investors to purchase an original copy of the US Constitution for $43.2 million.

Religion
Griffin is a member of the Fourth Presbyterian Church of Chicago, where he was married. In 2011, Griffin donated $11.5 million of the $38.2 million needed to build a new chapel at the church. The modern building is called "The Gratz Center" in honor of Griffin's grandparents.

COVID-19 donations
Griffin oversaw a $2 million donation from Citadel and Citadel Securities to Weill Cornell Medicine to help to fund the development of new ways to protect people from COVID-19 and to identify new cases of the illness.

In March 2020, in response to the COVID-19 pandemic, Griffin contributed $2.5 million to support food services for children in Chicago Public Schools.

In May 2020, Griffin and his partners at Citadel made a £3 million donation to help develop a COVID-19 vaccine and to support Nightingale Hospital.

Personal life

Marriages
Griffin's first wife was Katherine Weingartt, his high school sweetheart. The couple divorced in 1996.

In March 2002, Griffin met his second wife Anne Dias-Griffin after being set up on a blind date by a mutual friend. She is a French-born graduate of Harvard Business School who worked at Goldman Sachs, Soros Fund Management, and Viking Global Investors prior to starting Chicago-based $55 million firm Aragon Global Management. The couple married in July 2003 and had three children.

In July 2014, Griffin filed a divorce petition in Cook County, Illinois citing "irreconcilable differences" with his second wife. The couple had entered into a prenuptial agreement which governed the split of their assets in the event of a divorce. As part of the prenuptial agreement, Dias-Griffin received $22.5 million at the beginning of their marriage and received an additional $1 million each year they were married. During the marriage, she received $37 million in cash payments and 50% ownership of their Chicago penthouse, which occupies three floors of the building. In court fillings, she claimed that she was forced to sign the prenuptial agreement. She also claimed that Ken Griffin had no right to enter the Chicago penthouse. He allegedly forbade her from entering homes in Hawaii, Miami, Colorado and New York. In later court filings, Dias-Griffin requested $1 million per month in child support payments, including $300,000 per month for private jet travel, $160,000 per month for vacation rentals, and $60,000 per month for office space and staff. Griffin claimed that Dias-Griffin was attempting to use child support to fund her "opulent lifestyle". During the divorce, she requested $450,000 for a 10-day vacation to St. Barts over winter break with their three children. Griffin denied her request but agreed to pay $45,000 for a winter vacation. The couple settled their divorce out of court in October 2015, just hours before a public trial over the prenuptial agreement was set to begin. As part of the divorce, Griffin paid $11.75 million to buy out his wife's interest in their Chicago penthouse. He maintains joint custody of his children with his ex-wife.

Political views

In a 2012 interview with the Chicago Tribune, Griffin said that the rich actually have too little influence in politics. Griffin identified as a Ronald Reagan Republican. He said the belief "that a larger government is what creates prosperity, that a larger government is what creates good" is wrong.

In a November 2015 interview on CNBC, Griffin said he admires Scott Walker claiming he is an "absolute champion of free markets and a champion of smaller government".

In April 2016, because Citadel owned over 1 million shares of McDonald's, Griffin was the target of protestors supporting the Fight for $15. In May 2017, Griffin praised Donald Trump's efforts at tax and healthcare reform

In 2018, it was announced that Griffin had been appointed the national finance chair for the New Republican PAC fueling Rick Scott‘s Super PAC.

In November 2018, Griffin criticized Donald Trump's tweets berating Chair of the Federal Reserve Jerome Powell calling the tweets "completely inappropriate for the president of the United States".

In January 2019, Griffin was singled out by Elizabeth Warren on a Facebook post as someone who can pay her Ultra-Millionaire Tax. During a March 2019 interview with David Rubenstein, Griffin criticized Elizabeth Warren's proposals saying "soaking the rich doesn't work".

In January 2020, Griffin was absent from a signing ceremony for the phase-one trade deal with China at the White House, for which he was criticized by President Donald Trump.

In September 2020, Griffin wrote an op-ed published in the Chicago Tribune stating his opposition to Governor of Illinois J. B. Pritzker's "Fair Tax" proposal that would change Illinois income tax from a flat tax to a graduated tax. In an October 2020 email to Citadel LLC's Chicago employees, Griffin criticized Pritzker's tax plan and alluded to the possibility of moving his company out of Illinois.

While being interviewed by Paul Tudor Jones at the Robin Hood Foundation investor conference in October 2020, Griffin criticized Joe Biden's plans to raise the long-term capital gains tax rate.

Political contributions
In a 2012 interview, Griffin said that people should be able to make unlimited contributions to politicians, but that these contributions should be public.

Griffin has made political donations to conservative political candidates, parties, and organizations such as American Crossroads and the Republican Governors Association.

During the 2010 United States elections, Griffin donated $721,600 to federal candidates and political committees. Except for a $2,400 contribution to then United States Senate Committee on Banking, Housing, and Urban Affairs Chairman Chris Dodd, all of the contributions were to Republicans.

In December 2015, Griffin endorsed Marco Rubio for the 2016 Republican presidential nomination and stated that he planned to donate millions to a pro-Rubio super PAC. Before this endorsement, Griffin had donated $100,000 each to three super PACs supporting Rubio, Jeb Bush, and Scott Walker for the GOP nomination.

Griffin was the biggest donor to Rahm Emanuel's campaign for second term as Mayor of Chicago.

After Trump won the 2016 Republican nomination, Griffin did not contribute to his campaign.

In 2017, he contributed $20 million to the campaign of Governor of Illinois Bruce Rauner.

In March 2020, Griffin contributed $1 million to the 1820 PAC created to support the re-election bid of U. S. Senator Susan Collins in Maine. In late 2020, Griffin donated another $500,000 to the 1820 PAC.

In 2020, Griffin donated $20 million to the Coalition To Stop The Proposed Tax Hike Amendment, a group opposing the Illinois Fair Tax in its 2020 referendum. Weeks later, he donated another $26.75 million to the coalition. Griffin later donated another $7 million to the group bringing his total contributions to $53.75 million.

In 2020, Griffin donated $2 million to an anti-retention effort for Justice Thomas L. Kilbride, a democrat on the Supreme Court of Illinois.

Griffin supported Kelly Loeffler and David Perdue in the 2020–21 United States Senate election in Georgia. In October 2020, He was criticized for a $2 million contribution to a Super PAC supporting Loeffler and funded by her husband, New York Stock Exchange Chairman Jeffrey Sprecher, just after one of Citadel LLC's companies needed approval from Sprecher for a merger.

Griffin contributed a total of $66 million to the 2020 United States elections.

Citadel gave $800,000 to Janet Yellen for speaking fees.

In 2021, Griffin donated $5 million to Ron DeSantis, the governor of Florida. Griffin's donations to DeSantis prompted criticism of a possible conflict of interest when DeSantis began promoting Regeneron Pharmaceuticals' therapeutic treatment for COVID-19; Griffin's Citadel Securities owned $15.9 million of shares in Regeneron. A spokesperson for Citadel denied any wrongdoing, noting that the hedge fund has much larger investments in Pfizer and Moderna.

Later in 2021, Griffin promised to donate twice the amount to the Republican opponent of incumbent governor J. B. Pritzker that Pritzker gives to himself for the 2022 Illinois gubernatorial election. Pritzker has so far given $15 million to his campaign which now has the potential to become one of the costliest elections of the 2022 midterms.

On May 5, 2022, Griffin donated $1.5 million to Lisa Murkowski through Alaskans for L.I.S.A. (Leadership in a Strong Alaska).

Griffin has individually supported many candidates including:
 Sen. Kelly Ayotte (R)
 Sen. Susan Collins (R)
 Sen. John Cornyn (R)
 Sen. Jeff Flake (R)
 Sen. Cory Gardner (R)
 Sen. Kelly Loeffler (R)
 Sen. Shelley Moore Capito (R)
 Sen. Lisa Murkowski (R)
 Sen. Marco Rubio (R)
 Sen. Rick Scott (R)
 Sen. Luther Strange (R)
 Sen. Dan Sullivan (R)
 Sen. Todd Young (R)
 Rep. Andy Barr (R)
 Rep. Mike Bost (R)
 Rep. Jeff Fortenberry (R)
 Rep. Virginia Foxx (R)
 Rep. Mike Gallagher (R)
 Rep. Mike Garcia (R)
 Rep. Bill Huizenga (R)
 Rep. Young Kim (R)
 Rep. Kevin McCarthy (R)
 Rep. Darin LaHood (R)
 Rep. Tom Reed (R)
 Rep. Dave Reichert (R)
 Rep. Ann Wagner (R)
 Rep. Bruce Westerman (R)
 Esther Joy King (R)
 Kris Kobach (R)

Art collection
Griffin is an active buyer of modern art and contemporary art from mainstream artists. His portfolio is valued at close to $800 million and includes several paintings on the list of most expensive paintings.

In 1999, he purchased Paul Cézanne's 1893 painting Curtain, Jug and Fruit Bowl for a record $60 million at the time.

In October 2006, he purchased False Start by artist Jasper Johns for $80 million from David Geffen. In 2015, he purchased Gerhard Richter's 1986 painting Abstract Picture, 599 for $46 million.

In September 2015, in the largest private art deal ever, he purchased two paintings from David Geffen for $500 million: Willem de Kooning's 1955 oil painting, Interchange for $300 million, and Jackson Pollock's 1948 painting, Number 17A, for $200 million.

In 2017, Griffin reportedly purchased Andy Warhol's 1964 painting Orange Marilyn privately for around $200 million

In June 2020, Griffin purchased Boy and Dog in a Johnnypump (1982) by Jean-Michel Basquiat for over $100 million. He loaned the painting to the Art Institute of Chicago to be put on public display.

His collection also includes art by Njideka Akunyili Crosby.

Personal residences

Griffin owns personal residences valued in total at around $1 billion.

In 2009, Griffin purchased a full floor apartment at 820 Fifth Avenue in New York City for $40 million.

In 2015, Griffin purchased two apartments at the top of the Faena House, a condominium on Collins Avenue in Miami Beach, Florida for $60 million. He sold them in late 2020 at a loss.

In 2011, Griffin purchased two oceanfront homes at the Four Seasons Resort Hualalai in Kailua-Kona, Hawaii for $28 million.

In 2013 and 2015, Griffin purchased homes in Aspen, Colorado for $10 million and $12.8 million respectively.

In 2017, Griffin purchased a penthouse apartment atop the No. 9 Walton luxury condo tower in Chicago's Gold Coast for $58.75 million. The purchase broke the record for the most expensive sale in Chicago's history. The condo was delivered as "raw space" so that Griffin could build it out to his liking. Griffin also owns a full floor penthouse at the Waldorf Astoria private residences across the street from No. 9 Walton. Records show he purchased the penthouse for $6.884 million in 2010.

In 2019, Griffin purchased 3 Carlton Gardens, a Georgian mansion in London for $122 million. The purchase broke several records.

In 2019, Griffin set the record for the most expensive residential sale ever closed in the U.S. when he purchased roughly 24,000 square feet across three floors at 220 Central Park South in Midtown Manhattan for $238 million. The space was "raw space", meaning Griffin had to build it out. Several New York real estate experts have said that the purchase helped fuel legislation that increased taxes on luxury homes in New York. During an interview with David Rubenstein, Griffin said that the purchase represented the possibility of making New York City his home in the future.

Griffin has spent $450 million to assemble one of the largest private waterfront sites in Palm Beach County, Florida, with plans to build a 50,000 square foot estate.

In 2020, Griffin purchased a 7-acre oceanfront compound in Southampton, New York from Calvin Klein for $84.4 million.

In 2020, Griffin purchased several properties on Star Island in Miami Beach for a total of $95 million.

In 2022, Griffin purchased a waterfront mansion in Coral Gables, Florida for $45.25 million.

Private jets
Griffin owns two private jets: a 2001 Bombardier Global Express valued at $9.5 million, and a $50 million 2012 Bombardier Global 6000.

Withdrawn fraud accusation
In June 2006, Rush E. Simonson, claiming to be Griffin's mentor, filed a fraud case (2006-L-005997) against Griffin, alleging that he was entitled to a percentage of the profits of Citadel for creating a computer program upon which Citadel was founded. In court filings, Simonson said that he first befriended Mr. Griffin in 1982 as a computer salesman. The two struck up a business partnership engaged in convertible-arbitrage. Griffin provided the trading savvy, working both out of his Harvard dorm room and at home in Florida, while Simonson allegedly created the computer program that served as its technological backbone. According to the suit, Griffin struck a deal with a prominent Chicago investor in the late 1980s. As Griffin and Simonson began to unwind their partnership, the suit claimed, Griffin instead began to lay the foundations of what would become Citadel. In doing so, Griffin allegedly improperly took the program that Simonson had created. Simonson also said in his lawsuit that Griffin did not give him a cut of the profits of Citadel. In January 2007, Simonson dropped the lawsuit and apologized to Griffin.

See also
 List of Harvard University people

References

Further reading

 
 The Quants, Scott Patterson, Crown Publishing Group, February 2, 2010
 Ken Griffin's rise to power, CNBC, May 15, 2015

1968 births
20th-century American businesspeople
21st-century American businesspeople
American billionaires
American financial analysts
American financial businesspeople
American hedge fund managers
American money managers
American Presbyterians
American stock traders
Businesspeople from Chicago
Businesspeople from Florida
Harvard College alumni
Illinois Republicans
Living people
People from Daytona Beach, Florida
Stock and commodity market managers
Chief investment officers
Boca Raton Community High School alumni